Carmelo Garrido Alarcón (born 12 September 1971 in Puertollano, Ciudad Real) is a 5-a-side football player from Spain.  He has a disability: he is blind.  He played 5-a-side football at the 2004 Summer Paralympics.  His team finished third after they played Greece and, won 2–0.

References

External links 
 
 

Living people
1971 births
5-a-side footballers at the 2004 Summer Paralympics
5-a-side footballers at the 2016 Summer Paralympics
People from Puertollano
Sportspeople from the Province of Ciudad Real
Paralympic bronze medalists for Spain
Paralympic 5-a-side footballers of Spain
Medalists at the 2004 Summer Paralympics
Paralympic medalists in football 5-a-side